ORP Bielik (295) was a  of the Polish Navy during the Cold War. The submarine was launched in the Soviet Union in 1955 where it served as S-279. In 1965 the ship entered Polish service where it served under the pennant number 295, and was active until 1988.

References

Bibliography
 

Whiskey-class submarines of the Polish Navy
1955 ships
Ships built in the Soviet Union
Ships built by Krasnoye Sormovo Factory No. 112